Chancery (Welsh: Rhydgaled) is a hamlet in Llanfarian community, in the district county of Ceredigion, Mid-Wales, south of the administrative centre Aberystwyth.

The Conrah Hotel is an old lodge on the outskirts of the hamlet. A school at Chancery is referred to in a World War II children's evacuation account.

References

Villages in Ceredigion